Cunningham Township is a township in Chariton County, in the U.S. state of Missouri.

Cunningham Township was established in 1840, taking the name of Dr. John F. Cunningham, a pioneer citizen.

References

Townships in Missouri
Townships in Chariton County, Missouri